The 2017 Women's Rugby League World Cup Final was a rugby league match which determined the winner of the 2017 Women's Rugby League World Cup. It was played between reigning champions Australia and their rivals New Zealand on 2 December 2017 at Brisbane Stadium in Brisbane, immediately before the final of the concurrent men's competition. It was the third consecutive time that the two sides played in the World Cup final.

Australia emerged victorious, winning the match 23–16 and earning their second World Cup win.

Route to the final
Both teams had little difficulty reaching the final, each winning their group matches and semi-final by large margins.

Match

Summary

First half

Kelly 8' Try  Moran conversion
Hireme 12' Try  (Converted Nati)
Hireme 20' Try (Conversion missed by Nati)
Moran 35' scores for Australia on the back of her own kick-chase, and converts

Second half

Walton scores 56'. (Moran Comverts)
Ballinger receives medical attention (59')
McGregor scores for new Zealand (69') (Converted by Nati)

Details

Statistics

Australia:

 Most tries: 2 – Isabelle Kelly
 Most goals: 3 – Caitlin Moran
 Most field goals: 1 – Caitlin Moran
 Most try assists: 2 – Ali Brigginshaw
 Most runs: 15 – Corban McGregor, Simaima Taufa
 Most running metres: 154 – Kezie Apps
 Most tackles: 43 – Simaima Taufa
 Most missed tackles: 5 – Chelsea Baker, Simaima Taufa
 Most line breaks: 1 – Nakia Davis-Welsh, Caitlin Moran, Zahara Temara, Elianna Walton

New Zealand:

 Most tries: 1 – Honey Hireme, Raecene McGregor
 Most goals: 2 – Kimoira Nati
 Most field goals: 0 – 
 Most try assists: 2 – Raecene McGregor
 Most runs: 15 – Laura Mariu
 Most running metres: 130 – Laura Mariu 
 Most tackles: 40 – Krystal Rota
 Most missed tackles: 5 – Nita Maynard, Hilda Peters
 Most line breaks: 2 – Honey Hireme

References

World
Women's Rugby League World Cup
World
Rugby league in Brisbane
Rugby league matches